Live at Slane Castle is a Red Hot Chili Peppers concert video released on November 17, 2003, two years after the release of their last concert DVD, Off the Map. The concert, which took place on August 23, 2003, was their first headlining show at Slane Castle in Ireland having previously performed there in August 2001 opening for U2. The show was one of the biggest ever for the band with 80,000 fans in attendance with tickets selling out in under two and a half hours. Foo Fighters also played as one of several supporting acts, and have their own DVD footage of the concert. Other acts supporting on the day included Queens of the Stone Age, PJ Harvey, Feeder and Morcheeba.

Track listing
"Opening Titles" John Frusciante, Flea and Chad Smith begin with an improvised jam
"By the Way"
"Scar Tissue"
 The first verse uses audio from another live performance to cover a mistake when the song was performed"Around the World "
"Maybe" (cover by John Frusciante)
 The performance cuts out a mistake John Frusciante makes. 
"Universally Speaking"
"Parallel Universe"
 The intro is "Latest Disgrace" by Fugazi from the album Red Medicine"The Zephyr Song"
"Throw Away Your Television"
"Havana Affair" (Ramones cover)
"Otherside"
"I Feel Love" (cover by John Frusciante) was played after "Otherside" but was cut from DVD release
"Purple Stain"
"Don't Forget Me"
"Right on Time"
 The intro is "London Calling" by The Clash from the 1979 album London Calling''
 "Soul to Squeeze" was played after "Right on Time" but was cut from DVD release due to Frusciante breaking a string during the song.
"Can't Stop"
"Venice Queen"
"Give It Away"
 Trumpet/Drum duet with Flea and Chad
"Californication"
 Segued from an improvised intro by Flea and Frusciante
"Under the Bridge"
"The Power of Equality"
"Closing Credits"

Personnel 
 Anthony Kiedis - lead vocals
 Flea - bass, trumpet, backing vocals
 John Frusciante - guitar, backing vocals
 Chad Smith - drums

Charts

Certifications

References

Red Hot Chili Peppers video albums
2003 live albums
2003 video albums
Live video albums
Warner Records live albums
Warner Records video albums